The DTA Combo is a French ultralight trike, designed by Dominique Corriera and produced by DTA sarl of Montélimar. The aircraft is supplied complete and ready-to-fly.

Design and development
The Combo was designed to comply with the Fédération Aéronautique Internationale microlight category. It features a cable-braced or strut-braced hang glider-style high-wing, weight-shift controls, a two-seats-in-tandem open cockpit with a full cockpit fairing and windshield, tricycle landing gear with wheel pants and a single engine in pusher configuration.

The aircraft is made from welded 4130 steel tubing, with Zicral alloy suspension. Its double surface wing is covered in Dacron sailcloth. A number of different wings and engines can be fitted to create several variants.

Variants
Combo FC 912 S Diva
This wing is supported by a single tube-type kingpost and uses an "A" frame weight-shift control bar. The powerplant is a four cylinder, air and liquid-cooled, four-stroke, dual-ignition  Rotax 912S engine.
Combo FC 912 S Magic
This wing is a "topless" design, supported by struts and uses an "A" frame weight-shift control bar. The wing features vortex generators on the leading edge and gives a glide ratio if 10:1. The powerplant is a four cylinder, air and liquid-cooled, four-stroke, dual-ignition  Rotax 912S engine.
Combo HKS Dynamic 15/430
This wing is supported by a single tube-type kingpost and uses an "A" frame weight-shift control bar. The powerplant is a twin cylinder, air-cooled, four-stroke, dual-ignition  HKS 700E engine. A distinctive feature of the Combo HKS Dynamic 15/430 is its all-black tubing.

Specifications (Combo FC 912 S Magic)

References

External links

Combo
2000s French sport aircraft
2000s French ultralight aircraft
Single-engined pusher aircraft
Ultralight trikes